A Romance of the Western Hills is a 1910 short silent drama film directed by D. W. Griffith, starring Mary Pickford and Blanche Sweet. A print of the film survives in the film archive of the Library of Congress.

Cast
 Mary Pickford as Indian
 Alfred Paget as Indian
 Arthur V. Johnson as Indian
 Kate Bruce as Tourist
 Dell Henderson as Tourist
 Blanche Sweet
 Charles West as The Nephew
 Dorothy West as Tourist
 Kathlyn Williams as Second Woman

See also
 List of American films of 1910
 D. W. Griffith filmography
 Mary Pickford filmography
 Blanche Sweet filmography

References

External links

1910 films
1910 drama films
1910 short films
Silent American drama films
American silent short films
Biograph Company films
American black-and-white films
Films directed by D. W. Griffith
Films with screenplays by Stanner E.V. Taylor
Surviving American silent films
1910s American films
1910s English-language films
American drama short films